Atalaya (Spanish for watchtower) may refer to:

Places

Spain
 Atalaya, Badajoz, a municipality in the province of Badajoz, Extremadura
 Atalaya (Madrid), a ward in Madrid
 Atalaya del Cañavate, a municipality in the province of Cuenca, Castile-La Mancha
 La Atalaya, Salamanca, a municipality in the province of Salamanca, Castile and León
 Atalaya Castle (Spain), a Moorish structure in Villena, province of Alicante
 La Atalaya, a former village that was destroyed to expand the Corta Atalaya open-pit mine
 Atalayas de Alcalá, (Talaies d'Alcalà), a mountain range in the Valencian Community

Puerto Rico
 Atalaya, Aguada, Puerto Rico, a barrio
 Atalaya, Rincón, Puerto Rico, a barrio

Elsewhere
 Atalaya, Buenos Aires, a settlement in Magdalena Partido, Argentina
 Atalaya, a part of the Guatemalan archaeological site Q'umarkaj
 Atalaya District, Veraguas Province, Panama
 Atalaya, Veraguas, capital of Atalaya District, Panama
 Atalaya Province, Peru
 Atalaya, Ucayali, Ucayali region, Peru
 Atalaya Castle (US), a mansion in South Carolina
  Atalaya Mountain, a hill in the Sangre de Cristo Mountains, Santa Fe, New Mexico, USA

Other uses
 Atalaya (plant), a genus of flowering plants in the family Sapindaceae

See also
Atalaia (disambiguation)
Atalya (disambiguation)